The Toleration Act 1719 was an Act of the Parliament of Ireland exempting Protestant dissenters from certain restrictions. That meant that Presbyterians had practical freedom of religion.

References

1719 in law
Acts of the Parliament of Ireland (pre-1801)
Christianity and law in the 18th century
Protestantism in Ireland
1719 in Ireland
1719 in Christianity